Dastjerd-e Sofla or Dastgerd-e Sofla may refer to:
 Dastjerd-e Sofla, Kerman
 Dastjerd-e Sofla, Kermanshah
 Dastjerd-e Sofla, Qazvin